Cauldron Pool is a hot, brackish steaming pond located east of Tow Bay and below the west slopes of volcanically active Lucifer Hill, in northwest Candlemas Island, South Sandwich Islands. The descriptive name, suggestive of a cauldron, was applied by the UK Antarctic Place-Names Committee in 1971.

References
 

Lakes of South Georgia and the South Sandwich Islands